Attila Horváth (born 4 January 1966 in Dunaújváros) is a former Hungarian international handball player. He was member of the national team that finished seventh at the 1992 Summer Olympics, and also represented Hungary on the 1993 World Championship a year later.

Awards
Hungarian Handballer of the Year: 1991

References

1966 births
Living people
Sportspeople from Dunaújváros
Hungarian male handball players
Hungarian handball coaches
Olympic handball players of Hungary
Handball players at the 1992 Summer Olympics